Bardowick is a Samtgemeinde ("collective municipality") in the district of Lüneburg, in Lower Saxony, Germany. Its seat is in the village Bardowick.

The Samtgemeinde Bardowick consists of the following municipalities:

 Bardowick
 Barum
 Handorf
 Mechtersen
 Radbruch
 Vögelsen
 Wittorf

References